Ōtara is a suburb of South Auckland, New Zealand (formerly Manukau City), situated 18 kilometres to the southeast of the Auckland CBD. Ōtara lies near the head of the Tamaki River (actually an arm of the Hauraki Gulf), which extends south towards the Manukau Harbour. Contemporary Ōtara is surrounded by the suburbs of Papatoetoe, East Tāmaki, Clover Park and Flat Bush. The suburb is noted for its proportion of Pacific Islander residents, who make up 78% of the Ōtara population, and its unusually low number of European New Zealanders (Pākehā) residents (10%).

History

Māori origins
In the Māori language, Ō-Tara means ‘the place of Tara’ or ‘territory belonging to Tara’, who was a rangatira (Māori chief) of the area.  'Ōtara' is in turn the shortened form of Te Puke o Tara (literally; ‘The Hill of Tara’); known also for a time as Smales Mount.  Te Puke o Tara was one of Ōtara's prominent volcanic cones, and prior to European settlement in the area was the site of a scoria cone pā.  Like most of Auckland, the Ōtara landscape is volcanic in origin and forms a part of what is known as the East Tamaki volcanic field, with Te Puke o Tara and Mātanginui (Greenmount) having been the dominant cones of Ōtara. A third cone called Highbrook by Pākeha (white/European) settlers and in Maori Te Puke Ariki nui or Te Maunga/mountain of the Great/paramount chief. Mātangi nui was also a pā site, not too far from Puke I Āki Rangi (Point View) which connected the Mangemangeroa valley, and the areas surrounding all three cones were thought to represent the densest area of pre-European settlement in East Tamaki, favoured  rich volcanic gardening soils and fresh water springs.

The mana whenua of Te Rohe o Tara are the local Iwi/Maori people known as Ngāi Tai, also called Ngāti Tai.  Ngāi Tai are said to have originated as a distinct iwi identity on the eastern coastline of Auckland shortly after the Tainui canoe/waka called there in about the mid-14th century.  According to Ngāi Tai tradition, Te Puke o Tara and Ōtara are named after the ariki (paramount chief) of Ngāi Tai known as Tara Te Irirangi, who lived from the late 18th century until 1852. An earlier name applied to the area was Ngā Kopi o Toi ('The Karaka Berries of Toi'), named for a karaka grove said by tradition to have been brought to Tamaki from the Chatham Islands and planted in the vicinity of Greenmount by Toi-te-huatahi.

Over time, with the emergence and expansion of later hapū/sub group of Iwi and iwi identities, Ngāti Tai occupying the area of Tara became closely interlinked by marriages with Te Akitai, Ngāti Tamaoho and Ngāti Kahu of the Tāmaki Makaurau (Auckland) confederation of tribes known collectively as Te Wai ō Hua, and with the Hauraki Gulf peoples of Ngāti Pāoa and Ngāti Tamaterā, among others.  The Ngāti Pāoa chieftain Hauauru noted in 1851 that by the mid-1830s Ngāti Pāoa, Ngāti Tamaterā and Te Akitai had competing interests in Ōtara. While all of these groups hold ancestral relationships to the Ōtara area, Ngāi Tai continue to retain recognised mana whenua status.

European settlement

During the 1830s, Ōtara was among many present-day suburbs of Manukau & Auckland originally included within the boundaries of what became known as the "Tamaki Block" or "Fairburn Purchase". Between 1836 and 1839, the newly arrived Church Mission Society (CMS) missionary William Thomas Fairburn began moves to establish a mission station at Maraetai while attempting to purchase a vast tract of land from various iwi of Auckland. Brokered as "an act of Christian peacemaking" between warring tribes on the Tamaki isthmus, Fairburn obtained "signatures" to the deed of purchase from over 30 Rangatira; few, if any of whom could read or write. Fairburn originally estimated the total area to contain , but it was later surveyed as being around 83,000. When the purchase came under scrutiny from the CMS, in 1837 Fairburn signed a deed promising to return one third of the land to the original inhabitants (a transaction which never took place), and unsuccessfully attempted to offer another third to the Church. Following the Treaty of Waitangi establishing New Zealand as a British Overseas Territories in 1840, Fairburn came under investigation from the new Government's Land Claims Commission. Following a protracted investigation (during which time Fairburn resigned from the mission), in 1848 the Commission disallowed Fairburn's original claim, awarding him instead a much smaller grant of just under . The remainder of the land, including Ōtara, was retained by the Crown as "surplus land" to be onsold to European settlers.

European settlement of Ōtara began in earnest from the 1850s onwards, with most settlers of the wider East Tamaki area being Scottish and Irish Presbyterians.  The most prominent settler of Ōtara during this period was the Wesleyan missionary Reverend Gideon Smales.  Smales had arrived from England in 1840, and upon his retirement moved to settle at East Tamaki, purchasing a  block from the Government in 1855, which included Te Puke Ō Tara.  Smales farmed the land at the foot of Te Puke Ō Tara and opened a quarry on the mountain; the entirety of which has since been destroyed.  Mātanginui Pā was also largely destroyed by quarrying from 1870 onwards and is now the site of the Greenmount Landfill.   from the Smales Mount/Puke Ō Tara estate on the remains of the original cone now form reserve known as Te Puke Ō Tara Hampton Park, which includes a stone church built in the 1860s and the remains of extensive stone walls from Smales' farm, both constructed from the quarried scoria.

Farming and rural industries remained the dominant characteristic of Ōtara throughout the late 19th and early 20th Centuries.

Following World War II, Otara was developed by the Auckland Regional Authority as a State Housing area.

Demographics

Ōtara had a population of 22,872 at the 2018 New Zealand census, an increase of 2,130 people (10.3%) since the 2013 census, and an increase of 849 people (3.9%) since the 2006 census. There were 4,518 households, comprising 11,244 males and 11,622 females, giving a sex ratio of 0.97 males per female, with 6,843 people (29.9%) aged under 15 years, 6,369 (27.8%) aged 15 to 29, 8,103 (35.4%) aged 30 to 64, and 1,554 (6.8%) aged 65 or older.

Ethnicities were 10.2% European/Pākehā, 21.9% Māori, 78.0% Pacific peoples, 6.4% Asian, and 0.6% other ethnicities. People may identify with more than one ethnicity.

The percentage of people born overseas was 34.3, compared with 27.1% nationally.

Although some people chose not to answer the census's question about religious affiliation, 18.1% had no religion, 70.4% were Christian, 2.5% had Māori religious beliefs, 1.1% were Hindu, 1.0% were Muslim, 0.3% were Buddhist and 0.9% had other religions.

Of those at least 15 years old, 966 (6.0%) people had a bachelor's or higher degree, and 4,056 (25.3%) people had no formal qualifications. 588 people (3.7%) earned over $70,000 compared to 17.2% nationally. The employment status of those at least 15 was that 7,206 (45.0%) people were employed full-time, 1,704 (10.6%) were part-time, and 1,347 (8.4%) were unemployed.

Notable people
Len Brown, first Auckland "Super City" Mayor and former Manukau City Mayor prior to the "Super City" merge
Pauly Fuemana of OMC, recording artist who achieved global success with the hit, "How Bizarre"
Tau Henare, 38th Minister for Māori Affairs and politician with the National Party
Eric Rush, former All Black, captain of the All Blacks 7's and two-time Commonwealth Games gold medalist
Sid Diamond and Deach, hip-hop artists and members of Smashproof
"The Beast" Manu Vatuvei, rugby league player for the Vodafone Warriors and the Kiwis
Junior Paramore, former Manu Samoa player
Ruben Wiki, former Kiwis, Raiders and Warriors player
Robert Rakete, radio and television personality
Tina Cross, entertainer
Rawiri Paratene, actor
Sam Lisone, rugby league player for Vodafone Warriors and Toa Samoa
 Beulah Koale, actor
"The Tongan Goddess" Nailini Helu, the world's first Tongan female professional boxer

Contemporary culture

Ōtara is the home of the "Otara Global Village" developing in the old relocated Baird's Intermediate school which was moved to the new site of the Sir Edmund Hillary Collegiate and renamed SEHC Middle School

The Village now houses a Kohanga Reo, a Maori language pre-school, a Koe Oaga Faka Niue – Fatamanu – pre-school, an alternative School for Boys and New Zealand's first Secondary/Tertiary College – Vaka Moana, an integral part of the Manukau Institute of Technology as well as a number of Community groups

The suburb achieved a mild degree of worldwide fame with the one-off hit single "How Bizarre", by hip-hop artists OMC. "OMC" stands for "Otara Millionaires' Club" – a tongue-in-cheek reference to the low socio-economic status of much of the suburb, Ōtara being one of the poorest parts of the Auckland region – Ōtara North being Auckland Region's suburb with the second lowest median income, at NZ$25,900 after Great Barrier Island at NZ$25,100, and compared to an average of NZ$37,300 and the highest value of NZ$60,000.

Ōtara is also known for its Saturday morning 'flea market' held in the Ōtara shopping center car park next to the South Campus of Manukau Institute of Technology.

In the 1970s Prime Minister Robert Muldoon's immigration policies led to police raids on some Ōtara residents by police in the search for illegal overstayers from the Pacific Islands.

Ōtara long had some of the highest crime rates of the country, but recently a major action against the Tribesmen and Killer Beez gangs (in 2008), and 2010s increases in police force numbers in the area, combined with a community policing approach, have been credited with both reducing crime and establishing less hostile attitudes between the locals and the police.

Education
Sir Edmund Hillary Collegiate consists of three schools on a single campus. Hillary College, Bairds Intermediate and Clydemore Primary School are the three schools that now form Sir Edmund Hillary Collegiate.

The Tangaroa College Teen Parent Unit shares its campus.

All these schools are coeducational. Rolls are as of 

Ōtara is also home to Manukau Institute of Technology's two main campuses.

References

External links
Photographs of Otara held in Auckland Libraries' heritage collections.

Ōtara-Papatoetoe Local Board Area
Suburbs of Auckland
Populated places on the Tāmaki River